Klallam, Clallam, Ns'Klallam or S'klallam (endonym: nəxʷsƛ̕ay̕əm̕ùcən), is a Straits Salishan language that was traditionally spoken by the Klallam peoples at Becher Bay on Vancouver Island in British Columbia and across the Strait of Juan de Fuca on the north coast of the Olympic Peninsula in Washington. The last speaker of Klallam as a first language died in 2014,  but there is a growing group of speakers of Klallam as a second language.

Klallam is closely related to the Northern Straits Salish dialects, Sooke, Lekwungen, Saanich, Lummi, and Samish but the languages are not mutually intelligible. There were several dialects of Klallam, including Elwha Klallam, Becher Bay Klallam, Jamestown S'Klallam and Little Boston S'Klallam.

Use and revitalization efforts 
The first Klallam dictionary was published in 2012. Port Angeles High School, in Port Angeles, Washington, offers Klallam classes, taught as a heritage language "to meet graduation and college entrance requirements." Beginning fall 2020, the Klallam language has been taught at Peninsula College in Port Angeles.

The last native speaker of Klallam as a first language was Hazel Sampson of Port Angeles, who died on February 4, 2014, at the age of 103. Sampson had worked along with Ed Sampson (d. 1995), Tom Charles (d. 1999), Bea Charles (d. 2009) and Adeline Smith (d. 2013), other native speakers of Klallam, and with language teacher Jamie Valadez and linguist Timothy Montler from 1992 to compile the Klallam dictionary. In 1999, this effort led to the development of a lesson plan and guidebooks to teach students the basics of the language through storytelling. In 2015, a complete grammar of Klallam was published for second language instruction and preservation of the language.

Bilingual English-Klallam street signs were installed at two intersections in Port Angeles in 2016. In 2020, Donald Sullivan, a member of the Port Gamble S'Klallam Tribe, installed street signs  in Klallam alongside existing English ones in Little Boston.

Phonology

Vowels
Klallam has 5 vowels:

 The sound e is rare, and occurs only before ʔ or y and y'. 
 The schwa can be pronounced as /ʌ/, /ɪ/, /ʊ/, or /ɑ/ depending on its environment:
 Before ʔ or h, it becomes /ɑ/.
 Around c and č, it becomes /ɪ/. 
 Before rounded dorsal consonants, it becomes /ʊ/.
 Vowels may be stressed or unstressed. Unstressed vowels are shorter and lower in intensity than stressed vowels.
 Unstressed schwas are often deleted. For example 'nətán' ("my mother") is often pronounced as 'ntán'. Schwa deletion is consistent for English-oriented opinion, but "for the best speakers this rule is variable".
 In the case of schwa deletion after a nasal consonant, the nasal consonant is doubled. For example, 'ʔínət' ("what did you say") is pronounced as 'ʔínnt' even in very careful speech. 
 Vowels are lowered when followed by a glottal stop :
 'bird'    → 
 'deer'    → 
 'salmon backbone'    →

Consonants
The 34 consonants of Klallam written in its orthography, with IPA in brackets when different:

 The alveolar affricate  contrasts with a sequence of stop + fricative .
 Doubled stops and affricates are pronounced as two separate sounds, but doubled sonorants and fricatives are pronounced as long versions of a single sound.

Syllable structure 
In Klallam, strings of consonants are acceptable both at the beginning and ends of syllables. In the onset, consonant clusters are rather unstructured, so words like 'ɬq̕čšɬšáʔ' (fifty) can exist without problem. Similarly, codas can contain similar clusters of consonants, as in 'sx̣áʔəstxʷ' (to dislike something, to be no good).

Stress 
Stress in Klallam defines the quality of the vowel in any given syllable and can occur only once in a word. If a vowel is unstressed, the changes are entirely predictable, as unstressed vowels get reduced to schwas. In turn, unstressed schwas are deleted. Mark Fleischer (1976) argues that schwa may be the only underlying vowel, as all others can be derived from the environment.

Stress normally falls on the penultimate syllable; however, some affixes attract stress. Additionally, not all words can have stress.

Morphology

Affixation 
Klallam is a polysynthetic language, like the other languages of the Salishan family. Affixation is common for both verbs and nouns, and affixes provide temporal, case, and aspectual information. Every word contains at least one root.

The Klallam word ɁəsxʷaɁnáɁyaɁŋəs ('smiling') includes prefixes, suffixes and an infix. In its component parts, Ɂəs-xʷ-naɁnáɁ-yaɁ-ŋ-əs means "be in a state of small laughing on the face" or more simply, "smiling".

There are many forms of prefix, suffix, and infix; below are a number of examples. Allomorphy is common; often, a single affix with have multiple phonetic realizations due to stress structure or the phonology of the word it is being added to.

Prefixes 
A common form of prefix is the time prefix. These prefixes can be added to nouns, adjectives and verbs to project ideas of time into the root's meaning. Examples include kwɬ- (already), twaw̓ (still), čaɁ (just now), and txʷ- (first, for a while).

Other prefixes add verbal semantics with meanings such as 'have', 'go to', 'go from', and 'be affected by'.

Suffixes 
Klallam has lexical suffixes, which are unique to the languages of northwest North America. They have inherently noun-like meanings and can function as the object of a verb, create a compound meaning, and act as the object of a number word. Many refer to body parts, but there are almost 100 lexical suffixes that cover a number of different ideas. Oftentimes, these suffixes can take on metaphorically extended meaning, so 'nose' can also be used to refer to a single point, and 'mouth' can mean 'language'. Below are examples of common lexical suffixes with alternate pronunciation in parentheses. Alternate pronunciations usually depend on the location of the stress in the root.
 -ákʷtxʷ (-aɁítxʷ) – ‘dollar, round object’
 -áw̓txʷ – ‘house, building, room’
 -áy – people
 -éɁqʷ – ‘head’
 -íkʷs (-íkʷən) – ‘body, of a kind’ 
 -tən (-ən) – ‘instrument, tool’
 -ucən (-cən, -cín, -úc) – ‘mouth, edge, language’
There are also activity suffixes that give more information about an activity, such as 'structured' with -ayu and -ay̓s, 'customary' with -iŋəɬ, or 'habitual' with -ənəq.

Infixes 
Sometimes plurality is marked with an infix (however, there are many ways to mark plurality). This infix marks collective plurality, meaning that instead of strictly marking multiple of a noun, it creates a group of the noun. This infix takes one of the forms -əy̓-, -aɁy-, -éy-, or -éye- depending on the root structure and stress placement proceeding the infix.

Reduplication 
There are multiple forms of reduplication in Klallam, and each lends a particular meaning to the word.

Two-consonant reduplication is a way to express plurality in about 10% of Kallam words. The first two consonants are copied and inserted before their location in the stem, and a schwa is inserted between them. For example, ləmətú (sheep) becomes ləmləmətú (bunch of sheep) through this process.

First letter reduplication is one of three ways to create a continuative verb form. The first consonant of a word is inserted after the first vowel, sometimes with a schwa added afterwards; for example, qán̓ cn (I steal) becomes qáqən̓ cn (I am stealing).

To create a diminutive form the first consonant is reduplicated with an additional 'suffix' of -aɁ afterwards and an infix of -Ɂ- later in the word. With this músmes (cow) becomes maɁmúɁsməs (little cow, calf). The diminutive is not limited to noun forms. When used on a verb, the meaning takes on the characteristic of 'just a little' or 'by a small thing'. With an adjective, the meaning is construed to a lesser extent then the original form.

Other forms of reduplication exist with meanings of 'characteristic', 'inceptive', and 'affective' aspects.

Syntax 
The typical word order in Klallam is VSO, but if the subject of the verb is obvious then the object and subject can be in any order. This means that VOS is a very frequent alternative structure. The subject is considered obvious when both participants are human and one possesses the other. For example, in kʷənáŋəts cə swéɁwəs cə táns, literally 'helped the boy his mother' (The boy helped his mother), the mother is possessed by the boy and therefore cannot be the subject. In this case, the sentence could also be written as kʷənáŋəts cə táns cə swéɁwəs, inverting the object and the subject. When an adjective is involved in a noun phrase, it comes before the noun it describes.

After the first verb, either the main verb or an auxiliary verb, often there is one or more enclitic particles "that serve to situate the speech act". These particles will add information about tense and mode or serve as evidential or question markers.

Case system 
In main clauses, Klallam uses an ergative pattern to mark the third person. The first and second persons in the main clause, however, and all persons in subordinate clauses follow an accusative pattern.

Verbs are intransitive unless marked with one of several transitivizing suffixes. The suffix -t on a verb indicates control by the actor. For example, in ćáɁkʷ cn ɁaɁ cə nətán "I got washed by my mother", the root is unmarked and the subject cn is a patient while the agent is the object of the oblique preposition ʔaʔ, but in ćáɁkʷt cn cə nəŋənaɁ "I washed my child", the -t transitive suffix marks that the agent subject, cn is in control of the action. In a similar manner, the transitivizer -nəxʷ indicates a lack of control.

A suffix -əŋ on a transitivized verb creates a passive construction. For example, c̓áʔkʷtəŋ cn ʔaʔ cə nəŋə́naʔ "I was washed by my child". There is additionally a middle voice in which the suffix -əŋ on an intransitive stem creates an antipassive construction indicating an agent subject. If no patient is mentioned in the middle voice, it is assumed that the patient and the agent are the same, as in an action being done to oneself. For example, ćáɁkʷəŋ cn would usually be taken to mean "I washed myself", but it is subject to some ambiguity, as it could also mean "I washed (regularly)" or "I did some washing".

References

Bibliography
 Brooks, Pamela. (1997). John P. Harrington's Klallam and Chemakum place names.  Proceedings of the International Conference on Salish and Neighboring Languages, 32, 144-188.
 Fleisher, Mark. (1976). Clallam: A study in Coast Salish ethnolinguistics. (Doctoral dissertation, Washington State University).
 Fleisher, Mark. (1977). Aspects of Clallam phonology and their implication of reconstruction. Proceedings of the International Conference on Salishan Languages, 12, 132-141.
 Mithun, Marianne. (1999). The languages of Native North America. Cambridge: Cambridge University Press.  (hbk); .
 Montler, Timothy. (1996). Languages and dialects in Straits Salishan. Proceedings of the International Conference on Salish and Neighboring Languages, 31, 249-256.
 Montler, Timothy. (1996). Some Klallam paradigms. Proceedings of the International Conference on Salish and Neighboring Languages, 31, 257-264.
 Montler, Timothy. (1998). The major processes affecting Klallam vowels. Proceedings of the International Conference on Salish and Neighboring Languages, 33, 366-373.
 Montler, Timothy. (1999). Language and dialect variation in Straits Salishan. Anthropological linguistics, 41 (4), 462-502.
 Montler, Timothy. (2005). [Personal communication].
 Montler, Timothy. (2012). Klallam Dictionary. Seattle: University of Washington Press.
 Montler, Timothy. (2015). Klallam Grammar. Seattle: University of Washington Press.
 Thompson, Laurence; & Thompson, M. Terry. (1969). Metathesis as a grammatical device. International Journal of American Linguistics, 35, 213-219.
 Thompson, Laurence; & Thompson, M. Terry. (1971). Clallam: A preview. University of California Publications in Linguistics, 65, 251-294.
 Thompson, Laurence; Thompson, M. Terry; & Efrat, Barbara. (1974). Some phonological developments in Straits Salish. International Journal of American Linguistics, 40, 182-196.

External links

 Klallam language  (main page)
 Klallam Grammar, Scalar Edition
 Nancy Kolsti, "Preserving a Culture", University of North Texas, 2003.
 Lower Elwha Klallam Tribe
 Jamestown S'Klallam Tribe
 Washington Post: "Northwest Tribe Struggles to Revive Its Language"
 Elaine Grinnell, Klallam storyteller and basket & drum maker

Klallam
Coast Salish languages
Indigenous languages of the Pacific Northwest Coast
Indigenous languages of Washington (state)
First Nations languages in Canada
Native American language revitalization
Extinct languages of North America
Languages extinct in the 2010s
2014 disestablishments in North America